24 Hours is a 1931 American pre-Code romantic drama film directed by Marion Gering and starring Clive Brook, Kay Francis, Miriam Hopkins and Regis Toomey. It was based on the novel Twenty-Four Hours by Louis Bromfield and the play Shattered Glass by Will D. Lengle and Lew Levenson. In the film, an alcoholic married man is accused of murdering the woman with whom he has been carrying on an affair. The title comes from the fact that the film takes place from 11 pm one night to the same time the following night.

Plot
At an evening party in New York City, the Towners mourn their failing marriage, then leave separately. The somewhat drunk Jim walks to a bar for some more liquor. Before he arrives, a man is shot to death outside the establishment; those inside hastily carry the body inside and surmise that someone named Tony is responsible. Meanwhile, Fanny is driven home by her lover, David Melbourn. On the way, she breaks up with him, telling him she realizes now that she still loves Jim. However, she plans to leave her husband, thinking she is not good enough for him.

Jim next heads to a nightclub to see his lover, star singer Rosie Duggan. He asks her if it is possible for a man to love two women, then remarks that the snow was red outside the bar. After he leaves, her ex-con husband Tony Bruzzi shows up. He wants her to take him back, but she has him thrown out, though she keeps his gun; she guesses from the red snow that Tony killed someone.

Later, she takes Jim home. He falls asleep on her chaise longue. Then Tony shows up, jealous and determined to kill Jim. She tells him that Jim is not there, but he does not believe her. When she refuses to open a locked door, they struggle and he accidentally kills her.

The next morning, Jim wakes up and finds Rosie's body. Meanwhile, Tony hides out at Mrs. Dacklehorst's place, but he is tracked down by Dave the Slapper and his gang; the man Tony shot was part of Dave's mob. Tony demands Mrs. Dacklehorst deliver or mail a letter to his gang, but she betrays him instead, and he is shot dead.

Jim is charged with Rosie's murder. When Fanny shows up at the police station, Jim tells her to divorce him so she will not get entangled in his troubles, but she refuses to do so. Fortunately, fingerprints on a liquor bottle at Rosie's place match Tony's, and Jim is released. The couple reconcile, and Jim promises to stop drinking.

Cast
 Clive Brook as Jim Towner
 Kay Francis as Fanny Towner
 Miriam Hopkins as Rosie Duggan
 Regis Toomey as Tony "Sicily" Bruzzi
 George Barbier as Hector Champion
 Adrienne Ames as Ruby Wintringham
 Minor Watson as David Melbourn
 Lucille La Verne as Mrs. Dacklehorst
 Wade Boteler as Pat Healy, a doorman, Rosie's brother
 Bob Kortman (uncredited) as Dave the Slapper
 Malcolm Waite (uncredited) as Murphy

See also
The House That Shadows Built (1931 promotional film by Paramount)

External links
 

1931 romantic drama films
American black-and-white films
American romantic drama films
Films based on American novels
Films based on multiple works
American films based on plays
Films based on works by Louis Bromfield
Films directed by Marion Gering
Films set in New York City
Paramount Pictures films
1931 films
1930s American films